Rock Creek is an unincorporated community in Baker County, Oregon, United States.  Rock Creek is west of Haines.

Rock Creek was platted in 1903, probably due to mining claims in the nearby Elkhorn Mountains. By 1913, Rock Creek contained several general stores and a butcher, but by the 1980s these were gone, with only a grange hall remaining, and probably failed due to the nearby successful cities of Haines and Baker.

References

Unincorporated communities in Baker County, Oregon
Populated places established in 1903
1903 establishments in Oregon
Unincorporated communities in Oregon